The 1984 Sohmor massacre, also known as the first Sohmor massacre, took place on 20 September 1984 when  the South Lebanon Army, backed by the Israel Defence Forces, fired guns and killed 13 civilians in the Lebanese village of Sohmor.

Background 
Sohmor is a Shia Muslim village in Western Beqaa. The South Lebanon Army, led by Antoine Lahad consists mainly of Christian and Druze militiamen, that have been trained and armed by Israel.

Attack 
While the IDF encircled the village, the SLA gathered 300 men, aged 16 to 39 years, in the main square to investigate a recent ambush that killed 3 Druze militiamen. The shooting went on for 15 to 30 minutes, killed 13 and wounded 40.

Aftermath 
Lebanese Information Minister Joseph Skaf called the attack part of a "series of massacres perpetrated by Israel or encouraged by it and carried out under its direct coverage and with its full support". IDF officials blamed the massacre on the SLA. Reporters were denied entrance to the village.

See also
Lebanese Civil War
1978 South Lebanon conflict
1982 Lebanon War

References 

1982 Lebanon War
Massacres in 1984
Massacres of the Lebanese Civil War
1984 in Lebanon
War crimes in Lebanon
September 1984 events in Asia
1984 murders in Lebanon
Violence against Muslims
Massacres of Muslims
Western Beqaa District
Massacres committed by Israel